Batocera migsominea is a species of beetle in the family Cerambycidae. It was described by Gilmour and Dibb in 1948. It is known from Tonkin, Vietnam; and Laos.

References

Batocerini
Beetles described in 1948
Beetles of Asia